This is a list of regions of Uganda by Human Development Index as of 2021.

See also 
 List of countries by Human Development Index

References 

Uganda
Uganda
Human Development Index